The Order of Honour is an order of Greece. It comes second in rank to the Order of the Redeemer, and was established in 1975, replacing the abolished Royal Order of George I.

It is conferred by the Greek government upon "Greek citizens who are distinguished in struggles for the Fatherland, to senior executives of the public administration, to eminent personalities of the arts and letters as well as to distinguished scientists or individuals who excelled in the field of trade, shipping and industry. It is also conferred upon foreigners who, due to their distinguished position and through their personal worth, have contributed to the promotion of Greece."

Grades
As all Greek orders, the Order of Honour has five classes:

 Grand Cross: wears the badge on a sash on the right shoulder, plus the star on the left chest
 Grand Commander: wears the badge on a necklet, plus the star on the right chest
 Commander: wears the badge on a necklet
 Gold Cross: wears the badge on a ribbon on the left chest
 Silver Cross: wears the badge on a ribbon on the left chest

Insignia
The badge of the order is a blue-enamelled cross, in silver for the Silver Cross class, in gold for the higher classes. The obverse central disc bears a portrait of the goddess Athena and the legend  ("Only the righteous should be honoured") on a white enamel band. The reverse bears a simplified national emblem of Greece in the form of a white Greek cross on blue, and on a circular band the legend  ("Hellenic Republic") and the year of the order's founding (1975).  The Silver and Gold Crosses have a diameter of 37 mm, while the senior grades have a diameter of 57 mm. The law also provides for the award of the Order with Swords (featuring a pair of crossed swords behind the cross), in recognition of wartime deeds.  however, no such awards have been made.

The star of the order is a silver eight-pointed star with straight rays, with the entire badge in the centre. The reverse bears the Greek national emblem in white enamel and the legend  1975 in gold letters. The star of the Grand Commander is 80 mm wide, and that of the Grand Cross 90 mm.

The ribbon of the Order is blue with orange edges. The first four grades have a ribbon of 35 mm, with 3 mm-wide edges, while the shash of the Grand Cross is 100 mm wide, with edges 8 mm wide.

History
When the ruling Greek military regime abolished the monarchy in June 1973, the two orders most associated with the monarchy, namely the Order of George I and the Order of Beneficence, were also abolished (Law 179 of 25 September 1973). The Order of George I was to be replaced by a newly constituted "Order of Honour", but it had not been realised until the regime's fall a year later. 

Following the restoration of democratic rule, Law 106 of 7 August 1975 "On the Orders of Excellence" regulated the new order structure of the Hellenic Republic, and reconfirmed the establishment of the Order of Honour, to be ranked second hierarchically after the Order of the Redeemer. A competition followed for the design of the new decoration, won by Konstantinos Kontopanos. His design was finalised in the Presidential Decree 849 of 11 November 1975. The reverse featured a circular white band with the words . In addition, the crosses were suspended from an oval laurel wreath. The French design also featured a new form of the star badge, in the form of an eight-pointed star, on which the entire cross badge was placed, while of the original design was four-pointed and featured only the cross's central disc with the head of Athena. This design was officially adopted in May 1977 (Presidential Decree 428), and the French firm provided two batches of orders until 1978.

In 1980, an order was given to a Greek firm for 200 crosses of a simplified design, but the result was again far from satisfactory: this type featured a purplish hue of blue, and the head of Athena was flipped and of bad quality. The situation was finally resolved in October 1984, with Presidential Decree 485, which established the current design as final. Since 1984, the orders awarded by the Greek Foreign Ministry and the Presidency of the Republic have been manufactured by the Swiss firm Huguenin Medailleurs, while orders issued to the personnel of the Greek Armed Forces and security forces have been of local manufacture.

Recipients 
 Marcin Wilczek (Silver Cross)
 Charles Upham

Citations

Cited sources

General references 

 

1975 establishments in Greece
Awards established in 1975
Honour (Greece), Order of
Honour